The Big Thrill, released in 1993, is the third full-length album by the German hard rock band Axxis. It was recorded in the USA with producer Joey Balin (Warlock, Doro).

Track listing
 "Better World / Livin' in the Dark" (M: B. Weiß; L: W. Pietsch / M: W. Pietsch; L: B. Weiß) - 4:21
 "Against a Brick Wall"  (M: B. Weiß, W. Pietsch; L: W. Pietsch) - 3:55
 "Stay Don't Leave Me"  (M: B. Weiß, H. Oellers, W. Pietsch; L: J. Balin) - 4:11
 "Little War"  (M: W. Pietsch, H. Oellers, B. Weiß; L: B. Weiß) - 4:22
 "No Advice"  (M: W. Pietsch, B. Weiß; L: J. Balin) - 3:35
 "Love Doesn't Know Any Distance"  (M: B. Weiß, W. Pietsch; L: B. Weiß) - 4:56
 "Heaven's 7th Train"  (M: B. Weiß, H. Oellers, W. Pietsch; L: W. Pietsch) - 5:49
 "Brother Moon"  (M: W. Pietsch, H. Oellers; L: W. Pietsch) - 4:52
 "Waterdrop"  (M+L: B. Weiß) - 5:33
 "The Wolf"  (M: W. Pietsch, B. Weiß; L: B. Weiß) - 4:45
 "Road to Never Neverland"  (M: H. Oellers, B. Weiß, W. Pietsch; L: B. Weiß) - 4:21

Personnel
Bernhard Weiß - vocals, guitars
Walter Pietsch - guitars
Werner Kleinhans - bass
Richard Michalski - drums
Harry Öllers - keyboards

External links
Official website

1993 albums
Axxis albums
EMI Records albums